Vilichu Vilikettu is a 1985 Indian Malayalam film directed and produced by Sreekumaran Thampi, starring Mammootty, Shubha, Balan K. Nair and Mahalakshmi. The film features songs composed by Raveendran.

Cast

Mammootty as Vijayan
Shubha as Mrs. Nair
Balan K. Nair as N. N. K. Nair
Mahalakshmi as Deepthi
Mala Aravindan as Jacob
Krishnachandran as Suresh
Babu Namboothiri as D.F.O Muhammed Kutty
Somasekharan Nair as Rema's father
Santhakumari as Rema's mother
Gomathi as  Rema
Babu Namboothiri as Muhammed
T. G. Ravi as Babu
Shivaji as Police Inspector
Sukumari as Vijayan's mother

Soundtrack
The music was composed by Raveendran and the lyrics were written by Sreekumaran Thampi.

References

External links
 

1985 films
1980s Malayalam-language films
Films directed by Sreekumaran Thampi